Qiz Korpi (also Romanized as Qīz Korpī; also known as Qezel Korpī, Qez Korpī, and Qez Kowrpī) is a village in Hulasu Rural District, in the Central District of Shahin Dezh County, West Azerbaijan Province, Iran. At the 2006 census, its population was 643, in 141 families.

References 

Populated places in Shahin Dezh County